Christopher Jim Birch  (August 28, 1950 – August 7, 2019) was an American politician who served as a member of the Alaska Senate for District M in 2019 and the Alaska House of Representatives for the 26th District from 2017 to 2019. Birch was a member of the Republican Party.

Early life
Birch was born to geologist Bettijeanne Birch and mining engineer Frank Birch in Sterling, Illinois in 1950. His family had a long history in Alaska and he grew up in mining camps near Fairbanks and the Brooks Range. Birch earned a bachelor's degree in Mining Engineering from the University of Alaska Fairbanks in 1972 and a Master of Science degree in Engineering Management in 1979.

Career
Birch served as the chairman of the Chugach Electric Association from 1997 to 2005, worked as the senior engineer of environment and planning at Ted Stevens Anchorage International Airport from 1998 to 2004, and served as the South Anchorage Representative for the Anchorage Municipal Assembly from 2005 to 2014. In 2016, he was elected to the Alaska House of Representatives for District 26. In 2018, he ran for the Alaska State Senate for District M and won with 58 percent of the vote. In the Senate, he served as chairman of the Resources Committee. Upon his death, Governor Mike Dunleavy nominated Representative Laddie Shaw to succeed him, but Senate Republicans rejected the nomination.

Personal life
Birch married Pamala Gay Bushey in 1978. They had two children, son Logan Thomas and daughter Talitha "Tali" Ann, and four grandchildren. Tali is a lawyer married to fellow lawyer Josh Kindred.

Death
Birch died from an aortic dissection on August 7, 2019.

References

External links

 Chris Birch at 100 Years of Alaska's Legislature

1950 births
2019 deaths
21st-century American politicians
Republican Party Alaska state senators
American civil engineers
Anchorage Assembly members
Deaths from aortic dissection
Engineers from Alaska
Fairbanks North Star Borough Assembly members
Republican Party members of the Alaska House of Representatives
People from Sterling, Illinois
University of Alaska Fairbanks alumni